Irakli Mtsituri (born 13 August 1995) is a Georgian freestyle wrestler. In 2019, he won one of the bronze medals in the men's 92 kg event at the 2019 World Wrestling Championships held in Nur-Sultan, Kazakhstan. Earlier that year, he also won a bronze medal in the 92 kg event at the 2019 European Wrestling Championships held in Bucharest, Romania.

Major results

References

External links 
 

Living people
1995 births
Place of birth missing (living people)
Male sport wrestlers from Georgia (country)
World Wrestling Championships medalists
European Wrestling Championships medalists
21st-century people from Georgia (country)